Nazir Ali (1945 – 5 January 2003) was a Pakistani film music director. He is tagged as the "king of dhamaal". He composed 123 songs in 39 Urdu films and 435 songs in 115 Punjabi films. He won 2 Nigar Awards during his music career prolonged over three decades.

Early life and career
Nazir Ali was born in Gakhar Mandi, Gujranwala district, British India in 1945. In 1961, he started his music career as an assistant musician for M. Ashraf, a musical duo. He also assisted musicians Bakhshi Wazir and Tasadduq Hussain for some time. Finally, he gained a chance as a solo music director with a film, "Paidagir" that was released in 1966. 

He got his first breakthrough as a musician from a film 'dhamaal', "Lal meri pat rakhiyo" recorded in the voice of Noor Jehan for the movie, "Dilan De Sauday" (1969). His first Urdu movie, "Aansoo", was released in 1971 and included several hit tracks like, "Teray Bin Yon Gharyian Beetein" (vocalized by Masood Rana / Noor Jehan), "Jan e Jan Tu Jo kahay" (vocalized by Mehdi Hassan), and others. Afterwards, he became one the busiest music directors in the Lollywood. Nazir composed 559 songs in 161 Urdu and Punjabi films. His last film "Gujjar 302" was released in 2001.

Musical style
During 1970s and 1980s, Nazir popularized the Punjabi film music, leaving an indelible mark on it. He was the first music director to infuse a touch of sufi 'dhamaal' into conventional Punjabi tunes, resulting in a distinct style of music. In 1969, he began collaboration with Noor Jehan from the most famous dhamaal song, "Lal meri patt rakhio bhala jhole laalan" for the film "Dillan de soday". In 14 Punjabi movies, they both created enchantment with damaal songs. It was reportedly said by the music critics of that time, "Nazir Ali was firmly grounded in the Punjabi ang."

Popular compositions
 Lal Meri Pat Rakhiyoo Bhala Jhoole Lalan De ... 1969 (Film: Dillan Day Souday - Punjabi), Singer: Noor Jehan, Poet: Old traditional lyrics written by a Sufi  poet Saghar Siddiqui to honor the 13th century Sufi saint Lal Shahbaz Qalandar
 Apna Bana Kay, Dil La Kay, Nass Jain Na, Meray Hania ... 1969 (Film: Genterman - Punjabi)
 Bhul Jan A Sab Gham Dunya Day, Jinnu Pyar Karran ... 1969 (Film: Dillan Day Souday - Punjabi), Singer(s): Masood Rana, Poet: Khawaja Pervaiz
 Sayyo Ni Mera Mahi, Meray Bhag Jagawan Aa Geya ... 1971 (Film: Mastana Mahi - Punjabi), Singer(s): Noor Jehan, Poet: Hazin Qadri
 Teray Bina Yun Gharian Beetin, Jaisay Sadiyan Beet Gein ... 1971 (Film: Aansoo - Urdu), Singer(s): Masood Rana, Poet: Khawaja Pervaiz
 Na Ab Woh Samaa Hay, Na Hayn Woh Fazaen ... Singer(s): Naseem Begum
 Zulf Da Kundal Khullay Na, Akh Da Kajal Dhullay Na ... 1972 (Film: Dhol Jawania Manay - Punjabi), Singer(s): Inayat Hussain Bhatti, Poet: Hazin Qadri
 Dildar Sadqay, Lakh War Sadqay, Tera Karm Hoya, Hoya Pyar Sadqay ... 1972 (Film: Sultan - Punjabi), Singer(s): Noor Jahan, Poet: Hazin Qadri
 Dil Ki Dharkan, Madham Madham, Nazren Milen Aur Jhuk Jayen ... 1973 (Film: Jaal - Urdu), Singer(s): Ahmad Rushdi/Runa Laila, Poet: Khawaja Parvez
 Russ Kay Turr Peye O Sarkar, Tor Kay Mera Sajra Pyar ... 1975 (Film: Khanzada - Punjabi), Singer(s): Masood Rana / Rubina Badar
 Sharbat Kay Badlay Pila Di Sharab, Tera Khana Kharab ... 1976 (Film: Aurat Ek Paheli - Urdu), Singer(s): Naheed Akhtar, Poet: Riaz ur Rehman Saghar
 Kuchh Dair To Ruk Jao Barsat Kay Bahany ... 1981 (Film: Bara Aadmi - Urdu), Singer(s): Noor Jahan
 Mahi Aaway Ga Main Phullan Naal Dharti ... 1986 (Film: Qaidi - Punjabi), Singer(s): Noor Jahan, Poet: Khawaja Parvez

Awards
Nazir received the best musician Nigar Awards for the following films:
 Mastana Mahi (1971)
 Sultan (1972)

Death
Nazir died on January 5, 2003, in Lahore.

References

External links
Nazir Ali at IMDb

1945 births
2003 deaths
Pakistani composers
Pakistani film score composers
Nigar Award winners